Global Initiative on Psychiatry (GIP) is an international foundation for mental health reform which took part in the campaign against the political abuse of psychiatry in the USSR. The organization is of NGO type.

Headquartered in Hilversum, GIP has regional centers in Tbilisi, Sofia, and Vilnius, and a country office in Dushanbe.

GIP is a main contributor to improving psychiatric care in countries of the former Soviet Union as well as Central and Eastern Europe. It has expanded its focus and as of 2010 is including projects in Asia, Africa, and the Caribbean.

GIP also focuses on the political abuse of psychiatry throughout the world and human rights monitoring.

History 
20 December 1980 saw the formation in Paris of the International Association on the Political Use of Psychiatry (IAPUP) whose first secretary was Dr Gérard Bles of France. Since the Congress in Honolulu in 1978, he has inspired the movement against the use of psychiatry for political ends. The organization campaigned against the political abuse of psychiatry in the Soviet Union by leading efforts within national and international psychiatric organizations to eradicate this systematic abuse. The IAPUP had no connection with any political group nor with antipsychiatry. The organization brought together and coordinated independent groups dedicated to the struggle against political abuse of psychiatry and composed of psychiatrists and human rights activists from Canada, France, the United Kingdom, the Netherlands, Switzerland, and West Germany. During its first two decades IAPUP, investigated the accusations of oppressive exploitation in a number of countries such as Argentina, Bulgaria, Chile, Czechoslovakia, Cuba, Eastern Germany, Hungary, Romania, South Africa, the Netherlands, and Yugoslavia. The publication of the IAPUP was Information Bulletin. The IAPUP included the following participating committees:
 Working Group on the Internment of Dissenters in Mental Hospitals;
 Committee of French Psychiatrists Against the Use of Psychiatry for Political Purposes;
 German Association Against the Political Abuse of Psychiatry;
 International Podrabinek Fund;
 Swiss Association Against Psychiatric Abuse for Political Purposes.

In 1986, Robert van Voren became General Secretary of the IAPUP. After the dissolution of the Soviet Union, the financing of the IAPUP headed by Robert van Voren ceased until it adopted program of broad compromises and, correspondingly, the opposite name of The International Association for the Abolition and Prevention of Political Psychiatry, or Geneva Initiative on Psychiatry. In 2005, the organization was renamed Global Initiative on Psychiatry (GIP). From 1995 to 2000, Chair of the Geneva Initiative on Psychiatry was James Birley.

Leadership 
The board is composed of professionals from some twenty countries. Chief Executive of the Global Initiative on Psychiatry is Robert van Voren, a Honorary Fellow of the British Royal College of Psychiatrists and Honorary Member of the Ukrainian Psychiatric Association. In 2005, he was knighted by Queen Beatrix of the Netherlands for his work as a human rights activist. He is a professor of Soviet and post-Soviet Studies in the Ilia State University in Tbilisi (Georgia) and in the Vytautas Magnus University in Kaunas (Lithuania).

Approach 
The Global Initiative on Psychiatry uses a local approach to helping the mentally ill in underprivileged countries around the world. In Robert van Voren's words, their idea is that "mental health services should be locally empowered, locally adapted, community based, user oriented, and focused on keeping people with mental illness in society, instead of taking them out." The organization has been involved in deinstitutionalizing mental health services for children in post-Communist countries. The GIP dedicates itself to promoting the necessary reforms to implement "humane, ethical, and effective mental health care throughout the world." Reports by the Global Initiative on Psychiatry are often comprehensive and consider the treatment options. The organization has campaigned with substantial success against poor mental health practices abroad, especially in China and the former communist states. Robert van Voren's contribution to reform of forensic psychiatry in states of the former Soviet Union is widely recognized.

References

Sources

Further reading 
 
 

 
Organizations established in 1980
1980 establishments in the Netherlands
Organisations based in Hilversum
International medical and health organizations
International human rights organizations
Scientific supraorganizations
Mental health organisations in the Netherlands
Health and disability rights organisations in the Netherlands
Non-profit organisations based in the Netherlands
Struggle against political abuse of psychiatry in the Soviet Union